"Wanted" is an episode of the BBC sitcom, Only Fools and Horses. It was the sixth episode of series 3, and was first broadcast on 15 December 1983. In the episode, after an incident with a local woman, Del Boy pretends that Rodney had been dubbed the 'Peckham pouncer' and is being hunted by the police, so Rodney goes on the run.

Synopsis
As Rodney Trotter walks home after an evening at The Nag's Head, he meets a drunken woman who is waiting for a bus. When he tries to stop her falling over, the woman hysterically accuses Rodney of touching her. Rodney tries to defuse the situation by saying that he is a doctor, then quickly runs off into the night, after the woman screams "Rape!"

The next morning at Nelson Mandela House, Rodney, worried and annoyed, confides to Del Boy and Grandad about the incident. When Rodney describes her, Del realises he knows the woman and sees an attempt to tease his younger brother. Del tells Rodney that the police dubbed him "The Peckham Pouncer", and that vigilantes were seeking him. When Rodney leaves the room and goes back to bed, Del explains to Grandad that Rodney had just met Blossom, a mentally ill hospital patient who is well known to the police for falsely accusing people of attacking her. Grandad asks why he does not tell Rodney; Del plans to keep the deception going for a joke, though Grandad warns him to be careful not to let it spiral out of control.

That afternoon, back at the Nag's Head, Del tells Trigger and Boycie about Rodney meeting Blossom, as well as Trigger mentioning how his tomboy cousin Marilyn was once accosted by Blossom. Then, Grandad calls Del with bad news: Rodney has gone on the run, has taken all the tinned food from the cupboard, and is hiding in a secret place. Del decides to go out and look for him.

The next morning, an exhausted Del returns home after having searched all over London for Rodney to no success. Grandad lambastes Del for not telling Rodney that it was a joke sooner. Del then starts to detect a strange smell. Grandad explains that it had been in the flats since last night, and it is coming from the ventilation shaft. Del deduces that Rodney is hiding in the tank room, where he is smoking marijuana.

Del finds Rodney there, and after offering food and whiskey, is honest and tells him about the joke and Blossom's past. Del promises to make it up to Rodney by taking him out for a big meal after giving him a shower. As Del takes a sip of scotch with water from a tap on one of the tanks, Rodney hints that he had urinated in the tank while in hiding.

Episode cast

Episode concept
 The idea for the script was based on a real life incident that happened to one of John Sullivan's friends, even including a woman named "Blossom".

References

External links
 
 

1983 British television episodes
Only Fools and Horses (series 3) episodes